Henry (Solomon) Lipson CBE FRS (11 March 1910 – 26 April 1991) was a British physicist.  He was Professor of Physics, Manchester Institute of Science and Technology, 1954–77, then professor emeritus.

Background
Lipson was born in Liverpool, England, into a family of Polish Jewish immigrants. His father was a steelworker at the Shotton works in Flintshire. His mother was very insistent about the importance of education and ensured that he attended Hawarden Grammar School where he won a scholarship and exhibition to study physics at Liverpool University. He graduated with First Class Honours in 1930 and stayed on to do research at Liverpool into crystal structures using x-ray diffraction.

Career

University of Liverpool
His research into crystal structures using x-ray diffraction became his primary research interest, and in this research he teamed up with Arnold Beevers and sought advice from Professor Lawrence Bragg (who had established a major crystallographic centre in Manchester). Whilst at Liverpool, and without significant funding Beevers and Lipson made most of their own equipment and invented an aid to calculation, Beevers-Lipson Strips, which were widely used in the days before computers and which made their names well known within the field.

University of Cambridge
In 1936, Bragg invited Lipson to move to Manchester, and he later followed Bragg in moves to Teddington and then, when Bragg became Cavendish Professor in 1937, to Cambridge. In Teddington in 1937 he married Jenny Rosenthal (23 January 1910 – 2009)

In practical terms, Lipson was in charge of the crystallography group in Cambridge, and took on a key role in nurturing young scientists. Whilst at the Cavendish he became convinced by contact with P. P. Ewald of the importance of the Fourier transform in X-ray crystallography.

Manchester Institute of Science and Technology
He was awarded a Liverpool DSc in 1939 and a Cambridge MA in 1942, but he never really integrated into University of Cambridge life and he moved to the Manchester College of Technology (later University of Manchester Institute of Science and Technology) in 1945 as head of the physics department.

The position carried no title or status, but under his direction it quickly became a world centre for crystallographic research pioneering optical approaches to x-ray diffraction based on the Fourier transform. In 1954 he was made a professor and in 1957 he was made a Fellow of the Royal Society. He officially retired in 1977 but remained active in the department.

Lipson had a strong belief in the social responsibility of scientists, was an active member of Scientists against Nuclear Arms and was twice president of the Manchester Literary and Philosophical Society. He was appointed a CBE in 1976.

Family
He had three children Ann (b. 1938), Stephen (b. 1941) and Judith (b. 1943). The death of his youngest daughter from leukaemia in 1990 devastated Henry. In 1991 the Lipsons were on a family visit to Haifa, Israel, where their son was Professor of Physics at the Technion. He suffered a heart attack and died on 26 April of that year.

Evolution
Lipson was a proponent of evolutionary creation. He authored a paper A Physicist Looks at Evolution which was widely quote-mined by creationists. Lipson was a critic of Darwinism but did not deny that species have evolved. The New Scientist quoted him as saying "I do not accept the Genesis account of creation as anything more than pleasing fantasy. My idea of creation is much subtler, but since it is not scientific (in the sense that it cannot be tested) I shall not expound it here."

Selected publications

References

1910 births
1991 deaths
Alumni of the University of Liverpool
Academics of the University of Liverpool
Academics of the University of Manchester Institute of Science and Technology
British crystallographers
British physicists
British Jews
Jewish scientists
Commanders of the Order of the British Empire
Fellows of the Royal Society
Manchester Literary and Philosophical Society